Arthur Staveley (24 July 1908 – 3 February 1977) was an Australian rules footballer who played for the North Melbourne Football Club in the Victorian Football League (VFL).

Notes

External links 

1908 births
1977 deaths
Australian rules footballers from Victoria (Australia)
North Melbourne Football Club players